VisualSVN Server is a freeware Apache Subversion server package for Windows. The package is designed and implemented to provide Subversion version control as a first class citizen application in an Active Directory environment. VisualSVN Server is a standalone product which installs in a couple of clicks and works out of the box. The paid Enterprise Edition of VisualSVN Server provides tighter integration with Active Directory environment and Multisite Repository Replication feature.

History 

The development of VisualSVN Server began to answer the demand of VisualSVN users for easier Subversion server installation, configuration and maintenance on Windows platform. The first public release of VisualSVN Server happened in 2007. For that time, VisualSVN Server was the only all-in-one Subversion server package which made Subversion server installation, as well as its configuration, maintenance and upgrades, really simple.

 VisualSVN Server 1.0 was released on November 15, 2007. It was the first public release of VisualSVN Server. The server was linked against Subversion 1.4.
 VisualSVN Server 1.1 was released on March 24, 2008. The release brought some face-lifting enhancements such as ability to modify server configuration via VisualSVN Server Manager console and Windows Authentication feature.
 VisualSVN Server 1.5 was released on June 19, 2008. VisualSVN Server was updated to Subversion 1.5 in this release. User authorization supports Active Directory group accounts in this release.
 VisualSVN Server 1.6 was released on October 13, 2008. VisualSVN Server Manager console received multiple enhancements in this update. The server writes its events to Windows Event Log.
 VisualSVN Server 1.7 was released on March 24, 2009. VisualSVN Server was updated to Subversion 1.6 in this release.
 VisualSVN Server 2.0 was released on July 18, 2009. VisualSVN Server 2.0 became available in two editions: Standard Edition and Enterprise Edition. New features that work in Enterprise Edition only are the advanced low-level and high-level logging to a dedicated Windows Event Log and the remote server administration. The release reached End Of Life on November 1, 2011.
 VisualSVN Server 2.1 was released on January 19, 2010. The release introduced full support for Integrated Windows Authentication, i.e. Active Directory Single Sign-On for Enterprise Edition users. The release reached End Of Life on September 26, 2013.
 VisualSVN Server 2.5 was released on October 11, 2011. VisualSVN Server was updated to Subversion 1.7 in this release. VisualSVN Server Manager console received multiple improvements and IPv6 support was added.
 VisualSVN Server 2.6 was released on June 18, 2013. VisualSVN Server was updated to Subversion 1.8 in this release. VisualSVN Server Manager console received multiple improvements, VisualSVN Server got improved authorization mechanism.
 VisualSVN Server 2.7 was released on September 20, 2013. The release introduced Repository Management Delegation feature for Enterprise Edition users.
 VisualSVN Server 3.0 was released on September 15, 2014. The release introduced Multisite Repository Replication feature for Enterprise Edition users. Starting from version 3.0, VisualSVN Server has 2 installation packages: 32-bit and 64-bit version. VisualSVN Server dropped support for Windows XP and Windows Server 2003.

Technologies 
 HTTPS. VisualSVN Server uses isolated built-in Apache HTTP Server to communicate with Subversion clients and web browsers over HTTPS.
 Integrated Windows Authentication. VisualSVN Server Enterprise Edition supports  Integrated Windows Authentication (IWA) out of the box. NTLM and Negotiate (SPNEGO) (NTLM and Kerberos) are supported via SSPI.
 Microsoft Management Console. All configuration and administration tasks with VisualSVN Server are done through VisualSVN Server Manager. VisualSVN Server Manager is a graphical administrative console implemented as an MMC snap-in. VisualSVN Server Manager can be installed separately from VisualSVN Server itself as a remote administration console.
 VisualSVN Distributed File System (VDFS). Multisite Repository Replication is based on VDFS technology. VDFS enables automatic, transparent, bidirectional replication of Subversion repositories between multiple locations (each secondary repository is writeable). VDFS follows the classic primary / secondary replication architecture and uses Microsoft RPC as its transport layer.
 Windows Installer. VisualSVN Server installation process is based on Windows Installer technology. The installation package is a signed Microsoft Software Installation (MSI) file that performs all necessary configuration tasks and makes VisualSVN Server accessible out of the box.
 Windows Management Instrumentation. VisualSVN Server supports the WMI interface through its own WMI provider. This allows VisualSVN Server administrators to write custom scripts on PowerShell, C#, C++, VBScript and VB.Net languages to manage VisualSVN Server.
 HTML5. VisualSVN Server uses HTML5 for its internal Web Interface for browsing Subversion repositories

Editions 

The VisualSVN Server is available in two editions: Standard Edition (freeware) and Enterprise Edition (trialware). VisualSVN Server Standard Edition is a fully functional Subversion server. VisualSVN Server Enterprise Edition adds additional features on top of those available in Standard Edition. The same installer is used for both editions of VisualSVN Server.

Standard Edition. VisualSVN Server Standard Edition is free of charge and is available for commercial use. It is a fully functional Subversion server.

Enterprise Edition. VisualSVN Server Enterprise Edition is a trialware with 30-days evaluation period. The trial enables additional features which are not available in Standard Edition:

 Integrated Windows Authentication (IWA). Active Directory Single Sign-On via NTLM or Negotiate (SPNEGO) and Kerberos through SSPI
 Multisite Repository Replication 
 Operational and Access logging
 Remote Server Administration 
 Repository Management Delegation

Supported systems 
VisualSVN Server supports the following operating systems:
 Windows Server 2008 R2
 Windows Server 2012
 Windows Server 2012 R2
 Windows Server 2016
 Windows Server 2019
 Windows 7
 Windows 8
 Windows 10

See also 
 Apache Subversion - Open-source version control system
 VisualSVN - Apache Subversion client, implemented as a package extension for Microsoft Visual Studio

External links 
 
 Apache Subversion

References

Apache Subversion
Windows-only freeware